Travellers in Space and Time is the seventh studio album by The Apples in Stereo released in 2010. It was the first album by the band to feature new drummer John Dufilho, as well as the first to cite Bill Doss and John Ferguson as permanent band members.  It is heavily influenced by the Electric Light Orchestra, especially their science-fiction concept album Time.

Background
"Dance Floor" was the first single released for the album. The video for the song features actor Elijah Wood, who signed the Apples in Stereo to his label Simian Records, and previously directed the video for their song "Energy". "Dance Floor" along with a few other tunes were popular among shoppers as they were featured on playlists for such stores as Forever 21, Hollister Co., and Old Navy.

Track listing

Personnel 
Adapted from liner notes.

The Apples in Stereo
 Robert Schneider - engineer, acoustic guitar, electric guitar, instrumentation, Mellotron, piano, electric piano, producer, synthesizer, vocals, background vocals, Vocoder
 John Dufilho - bass, drums, electronic percussion, engineer, electric guitar, handclaps, percussion, producer, sound effects, synthesizer, vocals, background vocals
 Bill Doss - cowbell, engineer, acoustic guitar, handclaps, Mellotron, melodica, electric piano, synthesizer, vocals, background vocals
 Eric Allen - engineer, bass guitar, electric guitar, handclaps, background vocals
 John Ferguson - engineer, electric guitar, handclaps, Mellotron, piano, electric piano, synthesizer, vocals, background vocals, Vocoder

Additional
 Rick Benjamin - trombone
 Merisa Bissinger - flute,  piccolo
 Rob Christiansen - trombone
 Russ Farnsworth - spoken word
 Dave Ferris - tabla
 Roger Ferguson - background vocals
 Christin Helmuth - background vocals
 Otto Helmuth - background vocals
 Heather McIntosh - cello
 Craig Morris - drums, acoustic guitar
 David Schneider - acoustic guitar
 Dan Sjogren - baritone sax

Production
 Kevin Brown - engineer
 Dan Efram - executive producer, management                        
 Roger Ferguson - engineer
 Bryce Goggin - electronic effects, engineer, mixing, producer
 Otto Helmuth - assistant engineer
 Merritt Jacob - assistant engineer
 Fred Kevorkian - mastering
 Jimi Mitchell - album artwork 
 Craig Morris - assistant engineer, mixing, producer
 Robert Schneider - producer 
 Adam Sachs - engineer
 Paul Stec - design, layout
 Carolyn Suzuki - design, layout
 Rebecca Turbow - illustration

References

2010 albums
The Apples in Stereo albums
The Elephant 6 Recording Company albums
Yep Roc Records albums
Albums produced by Bryce Goggin